Pakenham East railway station is a planned railway station in Pakenham, Victoria. Announced in 2020, the station is scheduled for opening in 2024 alongside a rebuilt Pakenham railway station, and will be built as part of the Level Crossing Removal Project.

References

Proposed railway stations in Melbourne

Railway stations scheduled to open in 2024